Mahmood Sariolghalam is a professor of international relations at the School of Economics and Political Science in Shahid Beheshti University (formerly Iran National University) since 1987. He was born in Tehran, Iran, in 1959. He received his B.A. degree in political science/management from California State University, Northridge in 1980 and his M.A. and Ph.D. degrees in international relations from the University of Southern California in 1982 and 1987, respectively. Sariolghalam also completed a postdoctorate program at  Ohio University in 1997. During the 2009–2010 academic year, he taught at  Kuwait University. He is currently a professor at Loyola Marymount University Westchester continuing to teach international relations.

Sariolghalam specializes in international politics of the Middle East, Iranian foreign policy and political culture and has written extensively in Persian, Arabic and English. He is a member of International Studies Association (US), Global Agenda Council of the World Economic Forum (Switzerland) and a non-resident scholar at ASERI (Italy).

Publications
 "International Relations in Iran: Achievements and Limitations," in International Relations Scholarship Around the World edited by Arlene Tickner and Ole Waever. Routledge: 2009; 
 "The Evolution of State in Iran: A Political Culture Perspective," published by the Center for Strategic Future Studies of Kuwait University: 2010, (Arabic and English); 
 "Iran in Search of Itself," Current History, December 2008; Iran's Political Culture, a field research based on 900 questionnaires (in Persian), third edition, Tehran: 2010;
 Iranian Authoritarianism during the Qajar Period, Center for Cultural and Social Studies, Tehran: 2010; 
 Rationality and Iran's Development (in Persian), 6th edition, Tehran: 2010; 
 Research Methods in International Relations (in Persian), 6th edition, Tehran:2010; 
 Iran and Globalization (in Persian), third edition, Tehran:2010.

External links
Biography on Shahid Beheshti University website
Biography on Kobe Gakuin University's Asia Pacific Research Center
Biography on [http://www.sariolghalam.com dr mahmood sariolghalam] website

Living people
Academic staff of Shahid Beheshti University
California State University, Northridge alumni
USC School of International Relations alumni
Ohio University alumni
Academic staff of Kuwait University
1959 births